Adalpur is a village in Hajipur block Vaishali district, Bihar, India.

Demographics
As of the 2011 Census of India, Adalpur has a population of  spread over  households.

Education facilities
Adalpur had 1 primary school.

References

Villages in Vaishali district